Mount Hawthorne is a prominent mountain in the Walker Mountains, rising directly south of the base of Noville Peninsula on Thurston Island, Antarctica. It was discovered by Rear Admiral Richard E. Byrd and members of the United States Antarctic Service (USAS) in a flight from the Bear on February 27, 1940, and was named by Byrd for Roger Hawthorne, a field representative for the USAS in the years 1939–41.

See also
 Mountains in Antarctica

Maps
 Thurston Island – Jones Mountains. 1:500000 Antarctica Sketch Map. US Geological Survey, 1967.
 Antarctic Digital Database (ADD). Scale 1:250000 topographic map of Antarctica. Scientific Committee on Antarctic Research (SCAR). Since 1993, regularly upgraded and updated.

References

Mountains of Ellsworth Land